is a retired professional boxer in the minimumweight (105 lb) division and former WBA world minimumweight champion.

Professional boxing career
Niida belonged to the Yokohama Hikari Boxing Gym, his trainer was Mitsunori Seki and Hidefumi Oikawa. He first won the WBA minimumweight title at the Pacifico Yokohama on August 25, 2001, when he defeated Chana Porpaoin by unanimous decision. On October 22 only two months later, Niida vacated the title, with the intention of retiring due to back problems and lost interest in boxing.

Niida returned two years later and challenged Noel Arambulet for the title at the same venue, but Niida suffered his first loss, by split decision. Niida fought against Arambulet again at the Korakuen Hall on July 3, 2004; this time Niida won the title by unanimous decision in addition to Arambulet not making the weight. Niida has successfully defended the title seven times since he regained it, winning his last defense occurring against Jose Luis Varela at the Korakuen Hall on March 1, 2008 by knockout in the 6th round. However Mitsunori Seki died from a subarachnoid hemorrhage on June 6, 2008, his death gave Niida an intense shock.

Yutaka Niida lost his title via a fourth-round TKO at the Pacifico Yokohama on September 15, 2008 to Nicaragua's Román González. Presumably, he hung his gloves after the fight. Niida won the achievement award for the 41st Japan Professional Sports Grand Prize that year.

In 2010, Niida founded a public company "World Famous" named after the entrance song of his champion days created by the Japanese rapper BiARD for him, and established a sports gym "Body Design 新井田式 (which means Niida method)" in Yokohama on November 20. Hidefumi Oikawa also works as one of ten or so trainers in this gym.

Professional boxing record

See also 
List of WBA world champions
List of strawweight boxing champions
List of Japanese boxing world champions
Boxing in Japan

References

External links 

 

1978 births
Living people
Sportspeople from Yokohama
World Boxing Association champions
Mini-flyweight boxers
World mini-flyweight boxing champions
Japanese male boxers